Naemi Briese (4 March 1908 – 20 August 1980) was a Swedish film actress.

Selected filmography
 Jolly Musicians (1932)
 Simon of Backabo (1934)
 Andersson's Kalle (1934)
 Oh, Such a Night! (1937)
 A Cruise in the Albertina (1938)
 Life Begins Today (1939)
 Little Napoleon (1943)
 She Thought It Was Him (1943)
 Motherhood (1945)
 Johansson and Vestman (1946)
 Soldier's Reminder (1947)
 No Way Back (1947)
 The Street (1949)
 The Light from Lund (1955)
 Night Child (1956)

The following films were directed by Ingmar Bergman:
 A Ship to India (1947) - Selma
 Summer with Monika (1953) - Monika's mother
 Sawdust and Tinsel (1953) - Mrs. Meijer, circus artist

References

External links

1908 births
1980 deaths
Swedish film actresses
Actresses from Stockholm
20th-century Swedish actresses